Gomez's Hamburger, also known as IRAS 18059-3211, is believed to be a young star surrounded by a protoplanetary disk. It was initially identified as a planetary nebula, and its distance was estimated to be approximately 6500 light-years away from Earth.  However, recent results suggest that this object is a young star surrounded by a protoplanetary disk, at a distance of about 900 light-years away.

It was discovered in 1985 on sky photographs obtained by Arturo Gómez, support technical staff at the Cerro Tololo Inter-American Observatory near Vicuña, Chile. The photos suggested that there was a dark band across the object, but its exact structure was difficult to determine because of the atmospheric turbulence that hampers all images taken from the ground. The star itself has a surface temperature of approximately 10,000 K.

The "buns" are light reflecting off dust.  A disk of dust seen nearly exactly edge-on obscures the star and produces the dark band in the middle, the "burger". It has a dim visual magnitude of 14.4.

References

Pre-stellar nebulae
Circumstellar disks
IRAS catalogue objects
Sagittarius (constellation)